Francis Carter Wood (December 30, 1869 – January 5, 1951) was an American cancer researcher, a pioneer in the use of X-rays and radium for treatment of cancer. Wood was the founder and the founding director of the Crocker Institute for Cancer Research.

He was also the founder of the pathology laboratory at St. Luke's Hospital, and its director from 1910 to 1948.
Wood was also a professor of clinical pathology and the director of Institute of Cancer Research at Columbia University.

Biography 
Wood was born on December 30, 1869, in Columbus, Ohio, and graduated from the Ohio State University in 1891. He graduated from College of Physicians and Surgeons of Columbia University in 1894, and joined the faculty of clinical pathology at Columbia University in 1896
From 1906 to 1912 he served as director of clinical pathology at Columbia University and also served as the director of the pathology laboratory at St. Luke's Hospital from 1910 to 1948, founding it in 1910.

Accolades 
The American Association for Cancer Research called Wood an "international authority on cancer and pioneer radiotherapist".
The New York Times called him "internationally known cancer research specialist who was a pioneer in the use of X-rays and radium" and said that Wood "is credited with many basic discoveries in principles of radiation".

Publications

Chemical and Microscopical Diagnosis (1909)
Cancer: Nature, Diagnosis, and Cure (1937)

References 

1869 births
1951 deaths
American pathologists
Cancer researchers
Columbia University faculty
Columbia University Vagelos College of Physicians and Surgeons alumni
Ohio State University alumni
People from Columbus, Ohio